The Clevedon branch line was a  branch railway line that ran from Yatton railway station on the Bristol to Taunton Line to Clevedon in North Somerset, England, with no intermediate stops.

It was opened on 28 July 1847 by the Bristol and Exeter Railway. Initially it was built as broad gauge but was converted to standard gauge in 1879.

History
Seaside resorts became fashionable during the early years of the reign of Queen Victoria. When the Bristol and Exeter Railway (B&ER) opened its main line (at first to Bridgwater) in 1841, a station was provided at "Clevedon Road", about  distant. In the 1845 the B&ER obtained the necessary Parliamentary sanction to open a branch line to the town. The line was opened on 28 July 1847.

Branch trains had a bay platform on the upside with an over-all roof. The line was built to the  broad gauge but converted to the standard  gauge over the weekend 27 to 29 September 1879.

Train services
Between 1924 and 1936 a business service from Bristol at 17:15 consisted of a coach slipped at Yatton, which was then taken to Clevedon on a local train.

Steam railmotors, auto-trains and diesel railcars were used on the line at different times. In its final years, the branch was operated by diesel multiple units or by a single-car diesel railcar. Even in its declining years the service was fairly frequent: the British Railways, Western Region timetable for 1964–1965 shows 24 trains in each direction, with a few more on Saturdays and during the summer, though no Sunday service.

Clevedon station
Clevedon station was situated at what is now Queen's Square shopping precinct which was built in the 1980s. A set of points are preserved and mounted upright as a reminder of the square's history.

Opened in 1847 it was originally a wooden structure but the single platform terminus was rebuilt in 1890. Clevedon had a signal box until the end of 1916, but from 1 January 1917 the branch was operated "under one engine in steam" arrangements. A ground frame was provided to operate the points in the goods yard at Clevedon which was locked or released by key on the train staff. On 10 June 1963 the goods service was discontinued and the goods sidings and ground frame abolished.

The station was demolished in 1968.

Closure
Traffic declined as road usage increased in the years following the Second World War. The line was closed to general goods traffic on 10 June 1963. The passenger station was unstaffed from this time and was referred to in timetables as "Clevedon Halt". Passenger services ceased on 3 October 1966 and the track was lifted soon after.

All the track bed in Clevedon has long since been built on as the town has expanded. The last original bits of track, around Kingston Seymour, were lifted in the late 1980s. Housing developments in the 1990s are built on some of the track bed in Yatton.

References

See also

 Weston, Clevedon & Portishead Light Railway
 Line on a 1949 OS map

Rail transport in Somerset
Closed railway lines in South West England
Railway lines opened in 1847
Railway stations in Great Britain closed in 1966
Beeching closures in England
Clevedon
1847 establishments in England